The Scene Is Dead is the second and last album by This Is Menace.

Track listing

Personnel

This Is Menace
Jason Bowld - drums, lead guitar, rhythm guitar
Mark Clayden - bass
Paul Fletcher - guitar
Gez Walton - guitar

Production
 Nigel Crane - photography
 Dose-Productions - artwork
 Rick Parkhouse - Producer

References

2007 albums
This Is Menace albums